Tarchi is an Italian surname. Notable people with this surname include: 

 Angelo Tarchi (composer) ( 1760–1814), Italian composer
 Angelo Tarchi (politician) (1897–1974), Italian politician
 Marco Tarchi (born 1952), Italian political scientist

Italian-language surnames